The 3 arrondissements of the Jura department are:
 Arrondissement of Dole, (subprefecture: Dole) with 190 communes. The population of the arrondissement was 83,474 in 2013.  
 Arrondissement of Lons-le-Saunier, (prefecture of the Jura department: Lons-le-Saunier) with 249 communes. The population of the arrondissement was 125,876 in 2013.  
 Arrondissement of Saint-Claude, (subprefecture: Saint-Claude) with 55 communes. The population of the arrondissement was 51,152 in 2013.

History

In 1800 the arrondissements of Lons-le-Saunier, Dole, Poligny and Saint-Claude were established. The arrondissement of Poligny was disbanded in 1926. In May 2006 the arrondissements of Lons-le-Saunier, Dole absorbed the canton of Villers-Farlay from the arrondissement of Lons-le-Saunier, and it lost the canton of Chaumergy to the arrondissement of Lons-le-Saunier. 

The borders of the arrondissements of Jura were modified in January 2017:
 66 communes from the arrondissement of Lons-le-Saunier to the arrondissement of Dole
 four communes from the arrondissement of Saint-Claude to the arrondissement of Lons-le-Saunier

References

Jura